Holcocera hemiteles is a moth in the  family Blastobasidae. It was described by Walsingham in 1912. It is found in Guatemala.

References

Natural History Museum Lepidoptera generic names catalog

hemiteles
Moths described in 1912